McNally Smith College of Music was a private for-profit music school in Saint Paul, Minnesota. Initially founded in 1984 as the Guitar Center of Minneapolis, it was renamed Musictech College and moved to St. Paul in 2001. The school was renamed again as McNally Smith College of Music by the school's two founders, Jack McNally and Doug Smith, to memorialize themselves on the school's 2005 20th anniversary.

Initially, the school's concept was vocational, with a mission of providing students with real world skills in which to earn a living in the music industry. The vocational school began with six instructors and 200 private lesson students in a 3,000 square foot space within the Minneapolis warehouse district on Washington Avenue. In the fall of 1986, the Guitar Center began offering a state-approved full-time program. By 2000, the guitar school had become a music college, with over 250 students pursuing associate degrees and diploma certificates. With financial assistance from the state of Minnesota and the city of St Paul, the college purchased and renovated the former St Paul Arts & Science Center building into a 60,000 square foot campus with a 12-studio audio production complex, customized classrooms, library, bookstore, café, and a 300-seat auditorium with a 20k-watt Midas/EV sound system. The school offered degree programs in Music Production, Music Business, Composition and Songwriting, Guitar, Bass, Keyboards, Brass and Woodwinds, Strings, and Liberal Arts. In the fall of 2009 the school opened the much-ridiculed "first nationally accredited diploma program for hip-hop". Over the next several years, BA and MA degree programs were added to the school's academic offerings. The school's graduation and employment record was fairly unimpressive, but there are several ex-MSCM students who have carved out successful and creative lives in the music and audio world.

In 2005, the reorganized McNally Smith College of Music, moved away from vocational training to more become a traditional liberal arts school with higher tuition and dramatically more administrative overhead. According to CollegeCalc.org, “Tuition for McNally Smith College of Music is $27,040 for the 2015/2016 academic year. This is 89% more expensive than the national average private for-profit four year college tuition of $14,323. The cost is 31% more expensive than the average Minnesota tuition of $20,702 for 4 year colleges. Tuition ranks 43rd in Minnesota amongst 4 year colleges for affordability and is the 17th most expensive 4 year college in the state. Price does not vary by residence. The school charges additional fees of $900 in addition to tuition bringing the total effective in-state tuition to $27,940.”  The college attempted to operate a European campus at the Media Docks in Lübeck, Germany, opening in 2004. The German campus was officially closed in 2009. School enrollment peaked in 2007 and began a downhill slide to the eventual bankruptcy declaration on December 17, 2017; a week before the end of the 2017 fall semester.

“On Tuesday, December 14, 2017, it was announced without forewarning that the college would close the next Wednesday, December 20 for financial reasons.” “In an email, McNally Smith board Chairman Jack McNally asked staff to continue working without pay until then so students could get credit for the term. ‘We fully understand the awkwardness and unfairness of this request,’ he wrote in the email to employees.”  Faculty and staff were not given a hint of notice before the sudden announcement and were not offered any opportunity to assist in preventing the school's closing. The financial decision to close the school was solely made by McNally and Smith, as the school's CFO had abruptly resigned a few weeks before the bankruptcy announcement. Bankruptcy proceedings were completed in late 2018 and the bankruptcy process complicated the lawsuits that were still in process (as of 2019). However, the bankruptcy court auctioned off the school's assets by mid-June, 2018.

The loss of the school, its facilities, and the contribution the students and faculty made to downtown St. Paul would be felt by the downtown community for many years as the school and students provided a significant source of income, employment, and entertainment resources for an otherwise dormant urban downtown.

Notable faculty
 John (Chopper) Black, recording engineer
 Mike Bogle, trombonist, pianist, vocalist, composer, and arranger
 Terry Burns, double bass player, composer, author
 Marvin Dahlgren, orchestral and jazz percussionist, educator, author, and clinician.
Dessa, (Artist in Residence) singer, songwriter, poet, published author and hip-hop artist
 Mike Elliott, guitarist, band leader, composer, author
 Joe Elliott, guitarist, educator, band leader, author
Freddy Fresh, underground dance music artist
 Scott Joseph Jarrett, multi-instrument musician, singer/songwriter, recording engineer and producer.
 Gordy Knudtson, drummer, percussion technique author.
 Joe Mabbott, record producer and recording engineer
 Michael McKern, educator, musician, recording engineer and studio owner 
Jeremy Messersmith, (Artist in Residence) singer/songwriter
 Scott Rivard, recording engineer, Minnesota Public Radio studio engineer who recorded most of the station's internationally famous Prairie Home Companion shows. As an engineer at Sound 80, Scott and Tom Jung made some of the first quality recordings on 3M's digital systems including Flim & the BB's, the second professional digital recording ever made in the United States.
Randy Sabien, jazz violinist, founder and chair of the Jazz Strings department of Berklee College of Music (1978–1981) and chair of the Strings department at McNally Smith in 2009.
 Bobby Stanton, guitarist, composer, winner of 7 Boston music awards, ASCAP and BMI awards, and is a professor at Berklee School of Music.
 Craig Schlattman, director, writer, producer, and cinematographer, 2008 Bush Foundation award recipient. 
 Pete Whitman, saxophone player, composer, band leader
 Toki Wright, rapper, organizer, and educator

References

Educational institutions established in 1985
1985 establishments in Minnesota
Music schools in Minnesota
Educational institutions disestablished in 2017
2017 disestablishments in Minnesota